Noureddine Ziyati (born 27 October 1974) is a Moroccan former football player.

Honours
Rapid București
Supercupa României: 2003

External links
 
 
 
 Noureddine Ziyati at Soccerterminal.com 

1974 births
Living people
Moroccan footballers
Moroccan expatriate footballers
Association football midfielders
Bursaspor footballers
Royal Antwerp F.C. players
FC Rapid București players
Expatriate footballers in Belgium
Expatriate footballers in Romania
Expatriate footballers in Russia
Moroccan expatriate sportspeople in Romania
Liga I players
FC Amkar Perm players
Russian Premier League players
Al-Sailiya SC players
People from Mohammedia
Qatar Stars League players
SCC Mohammédia players